Anatoly Fetisov (Russian: Анатолий Фетисов; born 1940) is a Russian coxswain who represented the Soviet Union. He competed at the 1956 Summer Olympics in Melbourne with the men's coxed four where they were eliminated in the semi-final.

References

1940 births
Living people
Russian male rowers
Olympic rowers of the Soviet Union
Rowers at the 1956 Summer Olympics
Coxswains (rowing)